is a Japanese boxer. He competed in the men's welterweight event at the 1988 Summer Olympics.

References

1963 births
Living people
Japanese male boxers
Olympic boxers of Japan
Boxers at the 1988 Summer Olympics
Place of birth missing (living people)
Asian Games medalists in boxing
Boxers at the 1986 Asian Games
Asian Games bronze medalists for Japan
Medalists at the 1986 Asian Games
Welterweight boxers
20th-century Japanese people